Watch it, Sailor! is a 1961 black and white British comedy film directed by Wolf Rilla and starring Dennis Price, Liz Fraser and Irene Handl. It was based on the 1960 play of the same name by Falkland L. Cary and Philip King, which was a sequel to their earlier play, Sailor Beware, and was filmed in 1956.

It was shot at Hammer's Bray Studios in Berkshire. The sets were designed by the art directors Bernard Robinson and Don Mingaye.

Premise
Albert, a sailor, returns home to Britain to marry his fiancée. He is getting drunk at a bar rather than going to the ceremony. A drunk at the bar explains the horror of the mother-in-law syndrome. He eventually leaves with his sailor companion Carnoustie and gets in a car to go to the ceremony but the car (an Austin Six) breaks down. They run to the church but the vicar has postponed the wedding to do a funeral..

Everyone is waiting in the church. The bride Shirley chats with her mother. Meanwhile her father Henry is latest of all and enters the pub which the sailors left and starts to get drunk.

Back at the bride's home the maid of honour, Daphne, says she is going back to the church to see Carnoustie.

However a telegram is received from Lt Comm Hardcastle saying the wedding cannot proceed for legal reasons.

Albert and Carnoustie are now at the church with the vicar and organist.

Cast

 Dennis Price as Lt. Cmdr Hardcastle
 Liz Fraser as Daphne Pink
 Irene Handl as Edie Hornett the bride's aunt
 Vera Day as Shirley Hornett
 Graham Stark as Carnoustie Bligh
 John Meillon as Albert Tufnell
 Marjorie Rhodes as Emma Hornett
 Cyril Smith as Henry Hornett
 Frankie Howerd as  Church Organist	
 Miriam Karlin as Mrs. Lack	
 Arthur Howard as Vicar
 Renée Houston as Mrs. Mottram	
 Brian Reece as Solicitor	
 Bobby Howes as Drunk	
 Harry Locke as Ticket Collector	
 William Mervyn as Ship's Captain	
 Marianne Stone as Woman with Child	
 Diane Aubrey as Barmaid

Critical reception
The Radio Times wrote, "A host of familiar British comedy talent fill out the cast including Irene Handl, Miriam Karlin and Frankie Howerd...this is unexceptional, though some enjoyment can be found watching the old pros go through their paces"; and Allmovie wrote, "the two great scene-stealers in this comedy of errors are Irene Handl as the bride's eccentric (okay, she's just plain dotty) aunt, whose ramblings have a surreal quality; and Dennis Price as the droll-witted officer who is forced by orders to interfere with the impending marriage, and then ordered to make it right. With the cock of an eye-brow or the slight curl of a lip, before he even utters a line, Price dominates every scene in which he appears, and even if the rest of the movie weren't as funny as it is, his performance would be worth the price of admission."

References

External links

1961 films
1961 comedy films
British comedy films
Films directed by Wolf Rilla
Films scored by Douglas Gamley
Films shot at Bray Studios
Films set in England
British films based on plays
Hammer Film Productions films
Columbia Pictures films
1960s English-language films
1960s British films